[[File:Bobby Bumps Chicken Dressing (1923).webm|thumb|Bobby Bumps Chicken Dressing (1923)]]
Bobby Bumps is the titular character of a series of American silent animated short subjects produced by Bray Productions from 1915–25. Inspired by R. F. Outcault's Buster Brown, Bobby Bumps was a little boy who, accompanied by his dog Fido, regularly found himself in and out of mischief. Each cartoon begins with a cartoonist's hand drawing Bobby, Fido and the backgrounds.

The first two cartoons were released in 1915 by Universal; the next few years' titles were released by Paramount Pictures as part of their Paramount Bray Pictograph and, later, Paramount Magazine short-subjects packages. Mid-1920s episodes were released by Educational Pictures.

The series was created by Earl Hurd, who directed and/or animated most of the films. The Bobby Bumps cartoons were the first to be produced using the cel animation process. Previously, animated cartoons were produced using paper animation: a new drawing was made for each frame of film. With cel animation, Bray drew his characters on clear sheets of celluloid, which he placed over still backgrounds during the photography process. Cel animation revolutionized the animation industry, and Hurd and his employer J.R. Bray held a patent for the process (and received licensing payments from all studios using the process) until 1932.

A 1918 short, Bobby Bumps Becomes an Ace, reflects the country's concerns about World War I. In this short, Bobby dreams that he shoots down German fighters and tries to sink a U-boat.

In 2019, a comprehensive Blu-ray/DVD collection from animation researcher/restorer Tommy José Stathes, Cartoon Roots: Bobby Bumps and Fido, was released, containing fifteen shorts and much background material.

Filmography

1915Bobby Bumps Gets Pa's GoatBobby Bumps Adventures1916Bobby Bumps and His Pointer Pup  - First Bobby Bumps cartoon produced at Bray Productions. Bobby Bumps Gets a SubstituteBobby Bumps and His GoatmobileBobby Bumps Goes Fishing  Bobby Bumps' Fly SwatterBobby Bumps and the Detective StoryBobby Bumps Loses His PupBobby Bumps and the Stork Bobby Bumps Starts a LodgeBobby Bumps Helps Out a Book Agent Bobby Bumps Queers a ChoirBobby Bumps at the Circus1917Bobby Bumps in the Great DivideBobby Bumps Adopts a TurtleBobby Bumps, Office Boy Bobby Bumps Outwits the DogcatcherBobby Bumps VolunteersBobby Bumps, Daylight CamperBobby Bumps, Submarine Chaser Bobby Bumps' FourthBobby Bumps' Amusement Park Bobby Bumps, Surf RiderBobby Bumps Starts to SchoolBobby Bumps' World "Serious"Bobby Bumps, ChefFido's Birthday PartyBobby Bumps, Early Shopper Bobby Bumps' Tank1918Bobby Bumps' Disappearing GunBobby Bumps at the DentistBobby Bumps' FightBobby Bumps On the RoadBobby Bumps Caught in the JambBobby Bumps Out WestBobby Bumps Films a FireBobby Bumps Becomes an AceBobby Bumps on the Doughnut TrailBobby Bumps and the Speckled Death Bobby Bumps, IncubatorBobby Bumps in Before and AfterBobby Bumps Puts a Beanery on the Bum1919Bobby Bumps' Last SmokeBobby Bumps' Lucky DayBobby Bumps' Night Out with Some Night OwlsBobby Bumps' Pup Gets the Flea-enzaBobby Bumps: Eel-ectric LaunchBobby Bumps and the Sand LizardBobby Bumps and the Hypnotic EyeBobby Bumps Throwing the Bull - Final Booby Bumps cartoon produced at Bray Productions. Their Master's Voice1920Bobby Bumps' Non-Stop FlightThe Doughnut LifterCaptain KiddletsOh, What a KnightBobby Bumps, Cave ManA Trip to the MoonPot LuckBobby Bumps' Orchestra (sometimes listed as Bobby Bumps, Conductor)

1921Pen and InklingsMixed DrinksCheckmatedBobby Bumps Joins the BandBobby Bumps Working on an IdeaShadow BoxingHunting and Fishing1922One Ol' CatRailroadingBobby Bumps at SchoolFresh Fish (includes a live-action Bobby)

1923The Movie DaredevilTheir Love Grew ColdChicken Dressing1925Bobby Bumps and Company1930
Skinny & Husky at Coney Island 

References
Citations

Sources
Lund, Karen (June 1999) "Innovative Animators" The Library of Congress Information Bulletin.'' Retrieved September 6, 2007.

External links

American film series
Articles containing video clips
Animated film series
Bumps, Bobby
Bumps, Bobby
Film series introduced in 1915
Bray Productions film series
Bumps, Bobby